Zee TV Canada is a Canadian Category B Hindi language specialty channel and is owned by Ethnic Channels Group. It broadcasts programming from Zee TV as well as local Canadian content.

Zee TV is a top rated entertainment channel from India featuring popular drama series which cater specifically to a female audience.  Its main focus is on scripted content including serials, soaps and sitcoms. It also airs news, music, religious content and reality shows.

History

Zee TV Canada was licensed by the CRTC on February 12, 2013 as Hindi Women's TV.  It officially launched on February 1, 2013 as Zee TV Canada, via Bell Satellite TV, Bell Fibe TV, Rogers Cable, Optik TV, and Shaw.

On April 2, 2013, Zee TV launched Zee TV HD, a high definition simulcast of the standard definition feed.  It is currently available on Bell Fibe TV, Rogers Cable, SaskTel and Optik TV.

References

External links
 
 ECG's Zee TV Canada listing
 Zee TV

Digital cable television networks in Canada
Television channels and stations established in 2013
Zee Entertainment Enterprises
2013 establishments in Ontario
Hindi-language television in Canada